Casearia tomentosa, commonly known as the toothed leaf chilla, is a species of flowering plant in the family Salicaceae, native to the Indian Subcontinent and Myanmar. It is one of 1,000 species that can be found in the Salicaeceae family. Casearia tomentosa has various phytochemical and pharmacological properties that are used in the treatment of many illnesses. It is most notable used in the treatment of seafood poisoning, diabetes, ringworm, and snake bites. Other common names include Bhari, Maun, Churcha, Sonne bethe, and Kakoli based on the region where it is found.

Authority 
This species was first identified by William Roxburgh, a surgeon and botanist who identified numerous plants native to India. His work was published in Flora Indica, written while he was the head of the Calcutta Royal Botanic Garden. He began collecting plants in Madras, India with Johann Gerhard König. König learned botanical principles from Linnaeus, who was known as the founding father of modern taxonomy. Casearia tomentosa was first published in Flora indica in 1832.

Description 
The chilla is a short trunked tree that can grow to be 8 metres tall, and is considered to be deciduous. The entire plant is very bitter. It has a perennial life cycle.

Leaves 
The leaves are simple and alternate. The shape can vary from  lanceolate, ovate, and elliptical. The leaves mostly have an obtuse shape, with some being oblique. Many lateral veins are present on the leaf, surrounding the midrib. The leaves range from a light green colour to a darker vibrant green. The size of the leaves and range from 5 cm to 12 cm long.

Flowers 
The inflorescence of chilla are arranged in a axillary glomerulus. They are bisexual flowers, with both male and female reproductive parts. The flowers are a white with a slight green tint. There are no petals present, however there are 5 sepals that are approximately 3 mm long. There are 8 stamen in a row which are about 2 mm long. The flower has a superior ovary that has 3 carpals present, and a short style. The plant most commonly flowers between February and August. Pollination can occur via insects, self, or cross pollination.

Fruit 
The fruit is an orange/red fleshy capsule with seeds in the middle. Juice from the flesh of the fruit is used to create a fish poison. Seeds can be self dispersed, via wind, birds, animals, or humans.

Subspecies 
The following subspecies are accepted

 Casearia tomentosa subsp. reducta – Sri Lanka
 Casearia tomentosa subsp. tomentosa

Global Distribution 
Casearia tomentosa can be found globally throughout Asia in India, Nepal, Pakistan, Sri Lanka and Malaysia. It can also be found in parts of Northern Australia. It is very commonly found in hilly areas.

Habitat 
Chilla prefers dry habitats and is commonly found in deciduous forests that have a maximum altitude of 900 meters. It is also able to grow along streams, although not common. It is vulnerable and susceptible to infection from a number of pathogens which include incests, powdery mildew, and mold.

Medicinal Properties 
Traditionally the whole plant (root, stem, and leaves) are ground into a fine powder following drying. Combined with other ingredients such as honey, turmeric, buttermilk, water, or lime juice, the powder is used in the treatment of pectic ulcers, edemas, fissures and cracks on the feet, colic pain, fever associated with malaria, tonsillitis, sunstroke, diarrhea, wounds, and bone fractures by herbal physicians. Adding the juice of the fruit to water causes the death of fish, as it turns into a toxin. The juice of the bark and root can be used to treat diabetes as it hypoglycaemic. Seed oil of Casearia tomentosa is used in the treatment of sprains. The juice of the bark on the stem is also used to cure ringworm.

Phytochemical Properties 
The pulp of the fruit is both diuretic and purgative, whereas ethanol extract from the leaves have proven anti-inflammatory properties. Extracts from the leaf and bark of Casearia tomentosa have antimicrobial properties against E. coli and B. subtilis and antifungal properties against F. solani, as well as significant antioxidant properties.

References

tomentosa
Flora of Pakistan
Flora of Nepal
Flora of India (region)
Flora of Assam (region)
Flora of Bangladesh
Flora of Sri Lanka
Flora of Myanmar
Plants described in 1824